The Falls may refer to:
 The Falls (Oates novel), 2004 novel by Joyce Carol Oates
 The Falls (Rankin novel), 2001 crime novel by Ian Rankin
 The Falls (mall), an open-air shopping mall in Kendall, Florida
 The Falls, Nova Scotia, a small community in Colchester County, Nova Scotia, Canada
 The Falls, Queensland, a locality in the Southern Downs Region, Australia
 The Falls, a 2011 LGBT film trilogy directed by Jon Garcia
 The Falls (1980 film), directed by Peter Greenaway
 The Falls (1991 film), a Canadian documentary film directed by Kevin McMahon
 The Falls (2021 film), a Taiwanese film by Chung Mong-hong

See also 
 Fall (disambiguation)
 Falls (disambiguation)
 The Fall (disambiguation)
 The Falls Road, a major road and district in west Belfast, Northern Ireland
 The Falls Church, a church in the city of Falls Church, Virginia near Washington, D. C.